Stylianos Pattakos (8 November 1912 – 8 October 2016) was a Greek military officer. Pattakos was one of the principals of the Greek military junta of 1967–1974 that overthrew the government of Panagiotis Kanellopoulos in a coup d'état on 21 April 1967.

Biography 
Pattakos was born on 8 November 1912, in the village of Agia Paraskevi in Rethymno Prefecture,  Crete, and studied at the Hellenic Military Academy. He was married to Dimitra Nikolaidi and had two daughters, Rosa and Eirini. His parents were farmers. He served as a Lieutenant during the Greco-Italian War (1940-1941) and as cavalry captain and cavalry major during the Greek Civil War (1946-1949). He was a deeply religious man.

Pattakos eventually rose to the rank of Brigadier and was assigned to the tank training centre at Goudi in Athens.

He, along with Georgios Papadopoulos and Nikolaos Makarezos, planned and executed the coup on the night of April 20 to April 21, 1967, claiming political anomaly had made them do so. Many leading politicians and journalists were arrested that night and were led to a hotel in Pikermi. Among them were Kοnstantinos Mitsotakis, Andreas Papandreou, Georgios Rallis, Manolis Glezos. Pattakos was assigned the Ministry of the Interior. He became also the vice president of Kollias government. As head of that post, Pattakos made the decision to strip Greek actress and political activist, Melina Mercouri, of her Greek citizenship and to also confiscate her property. Mercouri retorted "I was born Greek. I will die Greek. Mr. Pattakos was born a fascist. He will die a fascist". On 25 November 1973, Brigadier General Dimitrios Ioannides overthrew Papadopoulos. The following year, the 7-year Junta came to an end in the aftermath of the Turkish invasion of Cyprus.

The newly restored democratic government of Constantine Karamanlis put the junta officials on trial with charges of high treason and insurrection against Georgios Papadopoulos and other co-conspirators. Pattakos, along with the other leaders of the 1967 coup, Papadopoulos and Makarezos, were sentenced to death for high treason, following the trial. Shortly after the sentences were pronounced, they were commuted to life imprisonment by the Karamanlis government. Pattakos remained in prison for 17 consecutive years. He was released from jail on 28 September 1990 by the government of Konstantinos Mitsotakis allegedly due to health reasons and was put under house arrest. He was obliged to report to the police office for registration every 15 days. He later stated that he did not regret any of his actions during the dictatorship. In addition, he denied that people were tortured during the dictatorship, except Alekos Panagoulis and Spiros Moustaklis, who "had it coming". Pattakos died of a stroke on 8 October 2016 at the age of 103. His funeral took place on 11 October 2016, in Crete. Despite his requirement to his family to keep the funeral small when his death came on the news, many people were quick to attend it. Among them was Christos Pappas (member of the parliament and member of the ultra-nationalist party Golden Dawn) and many others.

Other info
Pattakos was nicknamed "trowel" since he frequently appeared at project inaugurations with a trowel in hand. A staunch non-smoker, he had ordered also all the restaurants in Greece to serve fried potatoes.

References

External link

1912 births
2016 deaths
Deputy Prime Ministers of Greece
Greek anti-communists
Greek nationalists
Greek centenarians
Men centenarians
Leaders of the Greek junta
Greek military personnel of World War II
Greek Resistance members
Hellenic Army generals
Greek military personnel of the Greek Civil War
Ministers of the Interior of Greece
People convicted of treason against Greece
People from Rethymno (regional unit)
Prisoners sentenced to death by Greece